The Gebba (or Geba) is a river of southwestern Ethiopia. It is a tributary of the Baro River, which is created when the Gebba joins the Birbir at latitude and longitude . The river is the planned site for the twin Gebba Hydro electric power dams.

Gebba River Dam 
The Gebba River Dam is to be constructed near the border of Jimma and Illubabur zones of Oromia State. The project agreement was signed on Monday September 8, 2014 as a joint venture between the Ethiopian Government, through the Ethiopian Electric Power Corporation (EEPCo), and the Chinese firms SINOHYDRO Corporation Limited and Gezhouba Group Company Limited (CGGC). Construction costs are estimated to be $583 million and take four and half years across two phases. 80% of financing will be through Exim Bank of China and the remaining 20% through the Ethiopian government. The dam will produce an estimated 391MW of electricity.

See also
List of rivers of Ethiopia

References

Gebba River

Rivers of Ethiopia
Ethiopian Highlands
Geography of Oromia Region
Sobat River